Pedlar Run is a stream in the U.S. state of West Virginia.

Pedlar Run was named in memory of two peddlers who died of exposure near the stream.

See also
List of rivers of West Virginia

References

Rivers of Monongalia County, West Virginia
Rivers of West Virginia